Taviq may refer to:
 Taviq, Kerman (طاويق - Ţāvīq)